Year 931 (CMXXXI) was a common year starting on Saturday (link will display the full calendar) of the Julian calendar.

Events 
 By place 

 Europe 
 Spring – Hugh of Provence, king of Italy, cedes Lower Burgundy to Rudolph II, in return for Rudolf's renunciation of all claims to the Italian crown. He receives the imperial crown, and induces the Italian nobility to recognize his son Lothair II as the co-ruler of Lombardia (Regnum Italiae). 
 King Harald Fairhair of Norway dies after a 59-year reign as the Scandinavian nation's first ruler. He divides the kingdom among his many sons (about 25 years ago) to bring peace. Unable to travel through the country - and perform his royal duties, Harald hands over power to his favorite son Eric Bloodaxe, who allegedly kills at least two of his brothers to gain the Norwegian throne that he will hold (approximate date).
 Rollo, duke of Normandy, dies at Rouen after an 11-year reign. He is the first leader of the Viking settlers to establish an independent dukedom (a vassal of the West Frankish Kingdom). His eldest son, William I Longsword, becomes the second ruler of Normandy (approximate date). 
 Ramiro II forces the abdication of his brother Alfonso IV and becomes king of León (Northern Spain). He has Alfonso and Fruela's three sons blinded in order to make them incapable of ruling.
 Ramiro II expands the border eastwards (nearly to the Pyrenees) and captures Burgos and the surrounding land. This land would soon be known as the County of Castile (approximate date).

 England 
 King Morgan Hen of Glywysing and Gwent (Wales) submits to the overlordship of King Æthelstan, and attends his court with Kings Hywel Dda of Deheubarth and Idwal Foel of Gwynedd.

 Asia 
 Emir Mardavij ibn Ziyar defeats and kills his rival Asfar ibn Shiruya. He conquers in rapid succession the Abbasid cities of Hamadan, Dinavar, and Kashan, and finally the entire region of Isfahan, which becomes his capital. Mardavij appoints his brother Vushmgir as the governor of Amol (modern Iran).

 By topic 

 Literature 
 Nómina Leonesa, an account of the kings of Asturias and León, is published (approximate date).

 Religion 
 March – Pope Stephen VII dies after a three-year reign. He is succeeded by John XI (at the age of 20) as the 125th pope of the Catholic Church. His mother Marozia is the powerful senatrix and patricia of Rome.

Births 
 March 28 – Liu Chengyou, emperor of Later Han (d. 951)
 September 19 – Mu Zong, emperor of the Liao Dynasty (d. 969)
 Adelaide, empress regent of the Holy Roman Empire (d. 999)
 Boris II, ruler (tsar) of the Bulgarian Empire (d. 977)
 Cao Bin, general of the Song Dynasty (d. 999)
 Fu (the Elder), empress consort of Later Zhou (d. 956)
 Li Congyi (Prince of Xu), prince of Later Tang (d. 947)
 Liutgard of Saxony, duchess consort of Lorraine (d. 953)
 Taksony, Grand Prince of Hungary (approximate date)
 Yang Guangmei, Chinese general (approximate date)

Deaths 
 January 27 – Ruotger, archbishop of Trier
 April 4 – Kong Xun, Chinese governor (b. 884)
 May 29 – Jimeno Garcés, king of Pamplona
 June 25 – An Chonghui, general of Later Tang

 Abu'l-Fadl al-Isfahani, Persian religious leader
 Asfar ibn Shiruya, Iranian military leader
 Bard Boinne, Irish poet and Chief Ollam
 Béatrice of Vermandois, Frankish queen 
 Gausbert, count of Empúries and Roussillon
 Gu Quanwu, general of the Tang Dynasty (b. 864)
 Harald I, king of Norway (approximate date)
 Hrotheweard (or Lodeward), archbishop of York 
 Ibn Masarra, Muslim ascetic and scholar (b. 883)
 Christopher Lekapenos, Byzantine co-emperor
 Robert II, bishop of Tours (approximate date)
 Rollo, Viking leader and count (approximate date) 
 Stephen VII, pope of the Catholic Church
 Wang Yanbing, prince of Min (Ten Kingdoms)

References